Family Confidential is an Australian factual television show that looks at Australia's most famous and influential families as they share, often for the first time on television, the private truths behind the well-known public face. This observational documentary series began on the ABC in 2011.

Episodes

Series 1
 Episode 1 | The Lowys
Pillars of the business and Jewish community, Frank Lowy and his family reveal a deep and painful wound that has haunted them for nearly 70 years in the first of a series on Australia's richest and most powerful families.
 Episode 2 | The Janes
Bob Jane's name and face is one of Australia's most famous brands, but the cost of this fame and the lifestyle it brought, has been significant.
 Episode 3 | The Mundines
Australia's most high profile Aboriginal family, the Mundines, have the fight of their lives on their hands, stemming from land that was once a source of power and pride.
 Episode 4 | The Barnes
A modern-day love story about the woman who helped shape the family behind rock'n'roll legend Jimmy Barnes.
 Episode 5 | The Waterhouses
The racing industry would never have been the same without the Waterhouses whose survival against the odds, to their fourth generation of bookmaking has amazed their critics.
 Episode 6 | The Hemmes
The Hemmes family behind the hugely successful House of Merivale and Mr John fashion name show their real colours behind the glamorous and flashy facade and enormous wealth.
 Episode 7 | The Garretts
The meteoric rise and tragic fall of the Andrew Garrett wine-making family and the turns of fate that thwarted their dreams of a multimillion-dollar wine and tourist empire.

Series 2
 Episode 1 | The Nolls
The private tale of three brothers saved by music, but separated by success.
 Episode 2 | The Courtenays
The extraordinary home truths behind Australia's most famous author, Bryce Courtenay.
 Episode 3 | The Dingos
The family strength behind one of Australia's most famous faces Ernie Dingo.
 Episode 4 | The Holmes à Courts
The untold story of Australia's first billionaire Robert Holmes à Court.
 Episode 5 | The Jacobsens
The Shakespearean drama behind Australia's most successful showbiz family.
 Episode 6 | The Casellas
The family saga behind Australia's most successful wine label.

Series 3
 Episode 1 | The Furness-Jackmans
 Episode 2 | The Kerrs
Miranda Kerr has been named 'the sexiest woman alive'. But behind the glamour and celebrity lies a tale of a down-to-earth country family defying the stereotypes with a strong sense of family values.
 Episode 3 | The Robertson Lettes
 Episode 4 | The Williams
 Episode 5 | The Costellos
 Episode 6 | The Blackmans

See also
 Dynasties

References

External links
Official web site http://www.abc.net.au/tv/programs/family-confidential/

Australian Broadcasting Corporation original programming
Australian factual television series
2011 Australian television series debuts
2015 Australian television series endings
English-language television shows